Martin P. Vangsli (February 1, 1903 – June 5, 1976) was a Norwegian cross-country skier who was awarded the Holmenkollen medal in 1937 (Shared with Olaf Hoffsbakken and Birger Ruud). At the 1931 FIS Nordic World Ski Championships, Vangsli earned a silver in the 50 km.

Cross-country skiing results
All results are sourced from the International Ski Federation (FIS).

World Championships
1 medal – (1 silver)

References

Holmenkollen medalists - click Holmenkollmedaljen for downloadable pdf file

External links

Holmenkollen medalists
Norwegian male cross-country skiers
Year of birth missing
Year of death missing
FIS Nordic World Ski Championships medalists in cross-country skiing